Larry Schneider (born July 26, 1949) is an American jazz saxophonist.

Early life
Schneider was born in Long Island in 1949. He attended the University of Massachusetts, where he studied biology but in 1970 he decided to become a professional musician instead.

Later life and career
After relocating to New York City, Schneider played as a sideman in the 1970s with Billy Cobham, the Thad Jones-Mel Lewis Orchestra, Horace Silver, Jim McNeely, Mike Richmond, and Bill Evans. Around 1980 he moved again, to San Francisco, where he worked with Hein van de Geyn and John Abercrombie, and increasingly played in Europe in the later 1980s and 1990s, with François Jeanneau, the Orchestre National de Jazz, Marc Ducret, François Méchali, Alain Soler, André Jaume, Éric Barret and others. After music, his second passion is tennis.

Discography

As leader
So easy** (Label Bleu, 1988)Just Cole Porter (SteepleChase, 1991)Blind Date (SteepleChase, 1992)Bill Evans... Person We Knew (SteepleChase, 1992)Mohawk (SteepleChase, 1994?)
 "Freedom Jazz Dance"   (Steeplechase) 1996Ali Girl (SteepleChase, 1997)Summertime in San Remo (Splasc(h), 1997)Ornettology (SteepleChase, 1998)Lemon Lips (Splasc(h), 2000)It Might As Well Be Spring (SteepleChase, 2000) Jazz (SteepleChase, 2001)
 "It Might As Well Be Spring"  (Steeplechase)  2003.

As sideman
With Ray AndersonBig Band Record (Gramavision, 1994)
With Billy CobhamA Funky Thide of Sings (Atlantic, 1975)
With Miles Davis and Quincy JonesMiles & Quincy Live at Montreux (Warner Bros., 1991 [1993])
With Marc DucretLe Kodo (Label Bleu, 1989)
With Bill EvansAffinity (Warner Bros., 1979) with Toots ThielemansWe Will Meet Again (Warner Bros.,1979)
With George GruntzFirst Prize (Enja, 1989)
With The Thad Jones/Mel Lewis OrchestraThad Jones/Mel Lewis Orchestra With Rhoda Scott  (Barklay, 1976)Live in Munich (Horizon, 1976)
With Horace SilverSilver 'n Percussion  (Blue Note, 1977)Silver 'n Strings Play the Music of the Spheres (Blue Note, 1979)
With Jody WatleyJody Watley (MCA, 1987)
With Diederik Wissels QuartetMalinka (Timeless Records, 1987)
With Chris Potter and Rick MargitzaJam Session Vol. 1'' (SteepleChase, 2002)

External links

References

American jazz saxophonists
American male saxophonists
Musicians from New York (state)
American male jazz musicians
Vital Information members
Label Bleu artists
SteepleChase Records artists
Timeless Records artists